Kwekwe General Hospital is the main referral hospital within Kwekwe District plus the nearby Zhombe District. It is a government-run institution in which the Kwekwe City Council has overall oversight. The hospital is one of a number in the Midlands Province offering free anti-retroviral therapy to people with HIV/AIDS. It services HIV/AIDS patients from across the whole Kwekwe District plus those from neighboring districts like Gokwe.

See also
Kwekwe
Mbizo

References

Kwekwe
Hospitals in Zimbabwe
Hospitals established in the 1900s
Buildings and structures in Midlands Province